Ruth Mary "Ruthie" Morris (born March 5, 1964) is the guitarist for the rock band Magnapop. Her pop punk/power pop guitar style helped to define the band's sound and she has co-written their minor hit singles "Slowly, Slowly" and "Open the Door".

History
Morris is originally from West Palm Beach, Florida and began playing music there as a member of The Pockets after first learning guitar at the age of 20. In 1989, she transplanted herself to East Atlanta, where she met Linda Hopper—a member of the Athens, Georgia music scene in the late 1970s and early 1980s. The two became friends and began writing songs together, forming the core of Magnapop. Magnapop went on to record four extended plays and three studio albums through the 1990s and released two minor hit singles on the Modern Rock Tracks chart—"Slowly, Slowly" and "Open the Door". The band also toured the music festival circuit and opened for major alternative rock acts such as R.E.M.

After the 1996 release of Rubbing Doesn't Help, Magnapop found themselves dropped by their record label, and unable to record for seven years due to contractual obligations. In this time, Morris moved to Seattle, Washington. In 2004, she played with the one-off group The New Candidates with Curtis Hall and released the 7" single "I'm Coming Down"/"Set It on Fire" on Mt. Fuji Records, with recording and mixing by John Randolph; recording, mixing, vocals, and percussion by Mike Jaworski; and bass guitar by Ben Larson. Hopper, Morris, and a group of Seattle musicians also demoed some Hopper/Morris songs during this period. In 2005, Magnapop released their first album in nine years—Mouthfeel—on Amy Ray's Daemon Records. The re-formed group toured to support the record throughout the United States and the festival circuit in Europe and has continued to perform and record through 2010. The self-released album Chase Park was made available in late 2009.

In the 2009 Georgia floods, Morris lost much of her musical equipment, Magnapop memorabilia, and the first Compact Disc pressing of Chase Park. Atlanta musicians—including former Magnapop bandmate Tim Lee and Amy Ray—threw a benefit concert to assist her in replacing her losses on December 15, 2009.

In 1993, Juliana Hatfield wrote "Ruthless" in honor of Morris after the two had a conversation about Camille Paglia while touring in 1992 ("We're all gushin', but I swear we really mean it, man/We're all sucking up to Ruthie.") It appeared as a B-side on the Juliana Hatfield Three singles "Spin the Bottle" and "My Sister".

Musical style

Morris is known for her particularly aggressive guitar-playing and its interaction with Linda Hopper's pop-influenced vocals. Critics have compared her style to punk acts like Ramones as well as softer alternative rock musicians such as Johnny Marr.

Discography

Morris' non-Magnapop releases include:
Holy Gang – "Free Tyson Free!" from the album Free Tyson Free! (1994)
Sampled guitar
New Candidates – "I'm Coming Down"/"Set It on Fire" (2004)
Guitar, songwriting, and vocals

See also

:Category:Songs written by Ruthie Morris

References

External links

Magnapop homepage

1964 births
Alternative rock guitarists
Alternative rock singers
American alternative rock musicians
American punk rock guitarists
American rock songwriters
American women rock singers
Lead guitarists
Living people
Magnapop members
Musicians from Atlanta
Singers from Florida
Musicians from Seattle
People from Decatur, Georgia
People from West Palm Beach, Florida
Resonator guitarists
Songwriters from Florida
Songwriters from Georgia (U.S. state)
Songwriters from Washington (state)
20th-century American women guitarists
20th-century American guitarists
21st-century American women guitarists
21st-century American guitarists
Singers from Georgia (U.S. state)
Singers from Washington (state)
Guitarists from Florida
Guitarists from Georgia (U.S. state)
Guitarists from Washington (state)
20th-century American women singers
21st-century American women singers
20th-century American women writers
21st-century American women writers
20th-century American singers
21st-century American singers
Women punk rock singers